Pogonortalis is a genus of signal flies in the family Platystomatidae. There are about seven described species in Pogonortalis.

Species
These seven species belong to the genus Pogonortalis:
P. commoni Paramonov, 1958 c g
P. doclea (Walker, 1849) i c g b (boatman fly)
P. fulvofemoralis Malloch, 1942 c g
P. hians Schneider & McAlpine, 1979 c g
P. howei Paramonov, 1958 c g
P. monteithi McAlpine, 2007 c g
P. uncinata Meijere, 1911 c g
Data sources: i = ITIS, c = Catalogue of Life, g = GBIF, b = Bugguide.net

References

Further reading

External links

 

Platystomatidae
Articles created by Qbugbot
Tephritoidea genera